On 23 April 2009, a clash erupted between the border guards of Afghanistan and Iran in Nimroz province near the Afghanistan–Iran border. One Iranian border guard was killed in the clash and another border guard was captured by the Afghan border police. According to General Saifullah Hakim, head of Afghanistan's border police in Nimroz, the cause of the clash was the incursion by the Iranian border guards into the Tang district of Nimroz province. Iran's Press TV also confirmed that a clash took place between the border guards of two countries and one Iranian soldier was killed while another was captured in the clash.

The two countries had also previously clashed in 2007 and 2008 and later on in 2021.

Background
Afghanistan and Iran share a long and porous border which the smugglers use to traffic drugs into Iran. Many Afghan also illegally cross the border to enter Iran. The activity of smugglers along the Afghanistan–Iran border are a source of bilateral tensions between the two countries. Border clashes between the border guards of the two countries are common in the area.

Clash
General Saifullah Hakim, head of Afghanistan's border police in Nimroz, told Radio Free Europe/Radio Liberty that the Iranian border guards had ignored the warnings issued by the Afghan forces after they illegally crossed the border into Afghanistan and entered the Tang district of Nimroz. In the resulting shoot-out with Afghan border police in Tang district, one Iranian border guard was killed while another was captured. General Hakim says that this has been acknowledged by the Iranian officials and the detained soldier along with the body of the deceased soldier will be returned to Iran. Iran's Press TV also reported the death one Iranian soldier and the capture of the other by the Afghan border police.

Previous clashes
On 8 March 2007, one Afghan and one Iranian border guard were killed in an armed clash along the Afghanistan–Iran border. The clash also left one border guard injured on both sides.

On 20 April 2008, an armed clash between the border guards of two countries left one Afghan civilian dead and two Iranian officers wounded.

See also
2021 Afghanistan–Iran clashes

References

2009 in Afghanistan
2009 in Iran
Afghanistan conflict (1978–present)
Afghanistan-Iran clash
Afghanistan-Iran clash
Afghanistan–Iran relations
Afghanistan–Iran border
Nimruz Province
21st century in Nimruz Province